Kamta Prasad Khatik also known as Kamta Prasad is an Indian politician belonging to Janata Party. He is a former member of the Madhya Pradesh Legislative Assembly, representing Kolaras constituency in 1977.

References

1957 births
Living people
Janata Party politicians
Madhya Pradesh MLAs 1977–1980